Thomas Pfyl (born 1 January 1987) is a Swiss alpine skier and Paralympian.

He competed in the 2006 Winter Paralympics in Turin, Italy.
He won a silver medal in the Slalom, and a bronze medal in the Giant Slalom, standing. He became 8th at the Downhill and 4th at the Super-G, standing.

He competed in the 2010 Winter Paralympics in Vancouver, British Columbia, Canada, and became 10th in the Super combined, 7th in the Giant Slalom, 8th in the Downhill and 7th in the Slalom, standing.

Pfyl was the flag bearer for Switzerland at the 2010 Paralympic Games in Vancouver, British Columbia, Canada.

References

External links
 
 Athlete of the Month, January 2007 – Thomas Pfyl, at the Official website of the International Paralympic Committee (IPC)
 
 Athlete Search Results – Pfyl, Thomas, International Paralympic Committee (IPC)

1987 births
Living people
Swiss male alpine skiers
Paralympic alpine skiers of Switzerland
Alpine skiers at the 2010 Winter Paralympics
Paralympic silver medalists for Switzerland
Paralympic bronze medalists for Switzerland
Medalists at the 2006 Winter Paralympics
Paralympic medalists in alpine skiing
21st-century Swiss people